Derrick Eugene Caracter (born May 4, 1988) is an American former professional basketball player who last played for Capitanes de Arecibo of the Puerto Rican Baloncesto Superior Nacional. He played college basketball for Louisville and UTEP. Caracter played one season in the NBA with the Los Angeles Lakers.

High school and college career
Caracter grew up in Fanwood, New Jersey. He began attracting interest from college scouts in 2002 at the age of 14. He played high school basketball at St. Patrick High School as a freshman, and attended Scotch Plains-Fanwood High School as a sophomore before returning to St. Patrick's for his junior year. Caracter transferred to a boarding school, Notre Dame Preparatory School, during his senior year to focus on academics. In 2006, he began his college career at the University of Louisville.

He withdrew from the 2008 NBA Draft and later that summer left the University of Louisville. He then enrolled at UTEP and, as required by NCAA regulations, sat out the 2008–09 basketball season. He became eligible to play in the second half of the 2009–10 season where he averaged 14.1 points and 8.1 rebounds in 27 games as a junior with the Miners. In three college seasons, he averaged 10.2 points (.560 FG%) and 5.6 rebounds in 80 games (36 starts).

Professional career

Los Angeles Lakers (2010–2012)

2010–11 season
Caracter was selected with the 58th overall pick by the Los Angeles Lakers in the 2010 NBA draft. He joined the Lakers for the 2010 NBA Summer League. On August 15, 2010, he signed a multi-year, rookie deal with the Lakers. On March 29, 2011, he was assigned to the Bakersfield Jam of the NBA D-League. On April 5, 2011, he was recalled by the Lakers. He was reassigned to the Jam the next day. On April 13, he was again recalled by the Lakers.

2011–12 season
On December 12, 2011, Caracter tore his left lateral meniscus during practice. Throughout rehabilitation he attended team games, but didn't return to play. On January 25, 2012, he was assigned to the Los Angeles D-Fenders. On February 7, 2012, he was recalled by the Lakers and subsequently waived the same day.

On February 22, 2012, he was acquired by the Rio Grande Valley Vipers. On March 22, 2012, he was waived by the Vipers. On March 26, 2012, he was acquired by the Idaho Stampede. On April 21, 2012, he signed with Mets de Guaynabo for the rest of the 2012 BSN season. In his debut, he recorded 17 points and 5 rebounds in 19 minutes of play. On May 1, 2012, he left Mets de Guaynabo.

2012–13 season
In July 2012, he joined the Atlanta Hawks for the 2012 NBA Summer League. He later signed with Guangdong Southern Tigers of China for the 2012–13 season. On November 19, 2012, he left Guangdong after one pre-season game.

On December 4, 2012, he signed with Bnei Herzliya of Israel for the rest of the season.

2013–14 season
On August 26, 2013, he signed with Śląsk Wrocław of Poland. On September 4, 2013, he was released before playing in a game for them.

On October 11, 2013, he signed with BC Pieno žvaigždės of Lithuania for the rest of the 2013–14 season. In December 2013, he left Pieno.

On January 29, 2014, he was acquired by the Idaho Stampede.

2014–15 season
On September 19, 2014, Caracter signed a one-year deal with Flamengo Basketball of the Novo Basquete Brasil. He went on to help Flamengo win the 2014 FIBA Intercontinental Cup nine days later before leaving the club in October 2014. He went on to have a stint in Taiwan and Uruguay in early 2015 before signing with GlobalPort Batang Pier of the Philippine Basketball Association on March 11.

2015–16 season
On October 31, 2015, Caracter was acquired by the Erie BayHawks of the NBA Development League. On November 14, he made his debut for the BayHawks in an 83–79 loss to the Westchester Knicks, recording seven points and nine rebounds in 21 minutes. On February 2, 2016, he was waived by the BayHawks. In 24 games, he averaged 4.8 points and 3.6 rebounds on 44% shooting in 11.3 minutes of play. On February 24, he signed with Hapoel Ramat Gan Givatayim of the Liga Leumit.

2016–17 season
On September 6, 2016, Caracter signed with BC Prievidza of the Slovakian Extraliga. He left Prievidza after appearing in only two games, and on October 5, 2016, he signed with Israeli club A.S. Ramat HaSharon of the Liga Leumit. On December 28, 2016, he left Hasharon and signed in Argentina with Atletico Echague Parana of the Liga Nacional de Básquet.

2017–18 season
On January 11, 2018, Caracter signed with Capitanes de Arecibo.

NBA career statistics

Regular season

|-
| style="text-align:left;"| 
| style="text-align:left;"| L.A. Lakers
| 41 || 0 || 5.2 || .485 || .000 || .739 || 1.0 || .2 || .1|| .2 || 2.0
|-
| style="text-align:left;"| Career
| style="text-align:left;"| 
| 41 || 0 || 5.2 || .485 || .000 || .739 || 1.0 || .2 || .1|| .2 || 2.0

References

External links

NBA.com Profile 

1988 births
Living people
American expatriate basketball people in Argentina
American expatriate basketball people in Brazil
American expatriate basketball people in Israel
American expatriate basketball people in Lithuania
American expatriate basketball people in the Philippines
American expatriate basketball people in Slovakia
American expatriate basketball people in Uruguay
American men's basketball players
Bakersfield Jam players
Basketball players from New Jersey
BC Pieno žvaigždės players
BC Prievidza players
Bnei HaSharon players
Bnei Hertzeliya basketball players
Centers (basketball)
Erie BayHawks (2008–2017) players
Flamengo basketball players
Hapoel Ramat Gan Givatayim B.C. players
Idaho Stampede players
Los Angeles D-Fenders players
Los Angeles Lakers draft picks
Los Angeles Lakers players
Louisville Cardinals men's basketball players
NorthPort Batang Pier players
People from Fanwood, New Jersey
Philippine Basketball Association imports
Power forwards (basketball)
Rio Grande Valley Vipers players
Scotch Plains-Fanwood High School alumni
Sportspeople from Union County, New Jersey
The Patrick School alumni
UTEP Miners men's basketball players
American expatriate basketball people in Taiwan
Yulon Luxgen Dinos players
Super Basketball League imports